Kevin Paschal Lilly (born May 14, 1963) is a former American football defensive tackle in the National Football League for the San Francisco 49ers and Dallas Cowboys. He played college football at University of Tulsa.

Early years
Lilly attended Memorial High School. He played defensive tackle and contributed to the team winning the 1980 state championship. He accepted a football scholarship from the University of Tulsa.

Professional career

San Diego Chargers
Lilly was signed as an undrafted free agent by the San Diego Chargers after the 1986 NFL Draft on May 15. He was later waived and re-signed on August 11. He was released on August 25.

San Francisco 49ers (first stint)
On April 3, 1987, he was signed as a free agent by the San Francisco 49ers. He was released on August 28 and placed on the injured reserve list.

He was released four times and re-signed three times during the season. He turned down a chance to re-sign for a fourth time after being cut on December 13, but still received a ring and a full share of the playoff money after the team won Super Bowl XXIII.

He was signed on March 29, 1989. On September 14, he was released after the season opener to make room for linebacker Matt Millen.

Dallas Cowboys
On September 18, 1989, he was claimed off waivers by the Dallas Cowboys. He was a backup behind right tackle Dean Hamel an played sparingly in the third game against the Washington Redskins. He was released on September 28.

References

External links
Kevin Lilly Stats
Fanbase profile

Living people
1963 births
Sportspeople from Tulsa, Oklahoma
Players of American football from Oklahoma
American football defensive linemen
Tulsa Golden Hurricane football players
San Francisco 49ers players
Dallas Cowboys players